Tihamér Fabinyi (7 August 1890 – 11 June 1953) was a Hungarian politician who served as Minister of Finance between 1935 and 1938. He studied in Berlin, Leipzig, Cambridge, and in Budapest. He served as director of law of the Ganz Danubius Joint Stock Company, then he later worked as a lawyer. He was member of the House of Representatives between 1931 and 1936. In 1932, Gyula Gömbös appointed him Minister of Trade. He collaborated in the development of the Hungarian-Italian commercial contacts, Danube seafaring, tourism, and the resort area of Lake Balaton.

After the "Programme of Győr", he was succeeded by Lajos Reményi-Schneller. Fabinyi was the head of the General Credit Bank of Hungary from 1938 until 1944. After the occupation of Hungary, he emigrated to Switzerland, then the United States.

References
 Magyar Életrajzi Lexikon

1890 births
1953 deaths
People from Revúca
Finance ministers of Hungary